Transportation + Communication = Love is the debut album by American electronic band Figurine, released in 1999 then re-released in 2002 under the BlackBean & Placenta Tape Club record label. It includes twenty tracks.

Track listing
 "I Wait for You (By the Telephone)" – 3:26
 "F>I>G>U>R>I>N>E" – 1:10
 "New Mate" – 4:14
 "An Electronic Address" – 4:09
 "S.O.S." – 4:59
 "Batteries (Can't Help Me Now)" – 2:55
 "Robots" – 1:06
 "My First UFO" – 3:33
 "The European Beauty" – 4:13
 "Tired Eyes" – 3:55
 "Digits" – 3:18
 "Eurodiscoteque" – 3:34
 "New Millennium Song" – 3:42
 "International Space Station" – 3:06
 "Lifelike" (hidden track) – 2:50
 "You" (recorded Live in Berlin) – 2:20

Bonus tracks on 2002 reissue
 "S...p...a...c...e"
 "Zero Degrees"
 "Our Song"
 "?"

References

1999 debut albums
2002 albums
Figurine (band) albums